Windows File Recovery is a command-line software utility from Microsoft to recover deleted files. It is freely available for Windows 10 version 2004 (May 2020 Update) and later from the Microsoft Store.

Windows File Recovery can recover files from a local hard disk drive (HDD), USB flash drive, or memory card such as an SD card. It can work to some extent with solid-state drives (SSD).

The program is run using the winfr command. It has a mode designed for NTFS file systems, that will attempt recovery of files from a disk that is corrupted or has been formatted. Another mode will attempt recovery of specific file types from FAT and exFAT (predominantly found on external devices) and ReFS file systems.

See also
Data remanence
Data recovery
List of data recovery software
File History
Trash (computing)
Undeletion

References

External links

Microsoft free software
Windows commands
Windows-only free software